c6.org was an international media art and street art collective centred in London active from 1997 to 2010.

The group combined graffiti, new media art and performance art with political commentary throughout the 90s.

The founder of the group Leon Sessix also makes street art and stencil graffiti under the name Dotmasters.

References

Arts organisations based in the United Kingdom
Graffiti and unauthorised signage
New media art
Performance artist collectives
Street art